The 74th Troop Command is a brigade-level command of the District of Columbia Army National Guard that provides logistical and administrative support for nonorganic deploying MTOE units in the District that are not structured under another formation headquarters (HQ). It is the largest direct reporting unit in the District of Columbia Army National Guard. The Command is a subordinate of Joint Force Headquarters, District Area Command.

Current mission
As a separate STARC headquarters detachment in accordance with National Guard Regulation 10–2, the primary mission of the 74th Troop Command is to command, control, and supervise Army National Guard units attached to the troop command and to provide manned, trained and equipped units capable of immediate expansion to war strength and available for service in time of war or national emergency or when appropriate to augment the active army.

History
Comprising some of the most acclaimed units in the Army's rich history, the Command has heritage dating back to the DC Militia of the 18th century and its Revolutionary War roles. The command's subordinate units trace their roots back to the Civil War.

World War I to World War II 
The DCNG's all black 1st Separate Infantry Battalion was one of World War I's most trusted fighting units. This unit became a part of the 372d Infantry Regiment, which fell under the French 157th "Red Hand" Infantry Division, and saw extensive combat in World War I. The 1st Separate Infantry was hand selected to be a part of the Red Hand Division because they were known as extremely loyal.

DC National Guard units also joined the neighboring 29th Infantry Division of the Virginia and Maryland National Guards throughout battles in World Wars I and II.

The Cold War Era 
The 715th Truck Company saw combat in Korea. Naming their company orderly room "Blair House," they flew a DC flag over the Korean peninsula on 8 December 1951. 74th Troop Command heritage continued to deploy overseas to every major conflict in support of the United States Army throughout the Cold War era.

The Global War on Terror 
Each MTOE unit within the 74th Troop Command has deployed, in some capacity (either as an organic element in its entirety, or in the form of a forward detachment), to the U.S. Central Command area of responsibility in support of Operations Enduring Freedom (OEF) and Iraqi Freedom (OIF).

All eleven individual units within the Command's current force structure have deployed more than half of their soldiers in support of OEF/OIF, making it the most deployed force in the DC National Guard.

Current Organization
Headquarters and Headquarters Detachment, 74th Troop Command
372nd Military Police Battalion
Headquarters and Headquarters Detachment, 372nd Military Police Company
273rd Military Police Company
275th Military Police Guard Company
276th Military Police Company
547th Transportation Company
104th Maintenance Company
715th Public Affairs Detachment
District of Columbia Public Affairs Detachment
1946th Support Detachment
257th Army Band

References 

Troop Commands of the United States Army National Guard
Military in Washington, D.C.